Elections to Kennet District Council were held on 3 May 2007.  The whole council was up for election, and the Conservatives comfortably retained control, winning thirty-three of the forty-three seats available.

This was the last election of district councilors  to take place in Kennet. The following year, a government review of local government determined that the four district councils of Wiltshire were to be merged with Wiltshire County Council to form a new unitary authority with effect from 1 April 2009, when Kennet would be abolished and its councilors ' term of office would end two years early.

Elections to the new unitary authority, Wiltshire Council, took place in June 2009.

Election result

|}

Ward results

Aldbourne

All Cannings

Bedwyn

Bishops Cannings

Bromham & Rowde

Burbage

Cheverell

Collingbourne

Devizes East

Devizes North

Devizes South

Ludgershall

Marlborough East

Marlborough West

Milton Lilbourne

Netheravon

Ogbourne

Pewsey

Pewsey Vale

Potterne

Ramsbury

Roundway

Seend

Shalbourne

The Lavingtons

Tidworth, Perham Down and Ludgershall South

Upavon

Urchfont

West Selkley

See also
Kennet District Council elections

References

2007
2007 English local elections
2000s in Wiltshire